Apple Island is an island in the Mississippi River. The island is entirely within St. Charles County, Missouri.

The island most likely was named for the fact apples were shipped there.

References

Landforms of St. Charles County, Missouri
River islands of Missouri
Islands of the Mississippi River